Lure of the Wilderness is a 1952 romantic adventure Technicolor film directed by Jean Negulesco and based on the 1941 novel Swamp Water by Vereen Bell. The film is a remake of Jean Renoir's 1941 adaption of the novel. Walter Brennan appears in both films, although in a smaller version of his leading role in the earlier version.

Plot
In the 1910s in Fargo, Georgia near a dangerous swamp, Ben Tyler and his father Zack enter the swamp to search for two lost trappers. During an unsuccessful journey, Ben's dog Careless disappears while running after a deer. While looking for Careless, Ben is hit in the head by someone, and when he awakens, he finds himself captured by two people living in the wilderness: old Jim Harper and his fierce, aggressive but beautiful daughter Laurie.

Ben recognizes Jim, who has been accused of a murder committed eight years ago. Fearing lynching, Jim and his daughter have since fled the nearby village to live in the wilderness. Jim admits to one killing, claiming it was committed in self-defense, but insists that the other murder was committed by the vicious Longden brothers. Despite Laurie's clear lack of trust in him, Ben believes Jim's story and tells them that he wants to return to civilization to receive a fair trial.

Over the following days, Ben accompanies Jim and Laurie in their routine, which includes hunting. Laurie's hostility toward Ben softens and they share a mutual attraction. During a short return to home, Ben outrages his father and fiancée Noreen by announcing that he will soon return to the swamp. Noreen states that she does not plan to wait for him and that she will seek another beau. At a dance, Noreen provokes a fight between Ben and her date Jack Doran, and Ben eventually cancels the engagement.

Noreen follows Ben to Laurie and discovers her identity. She falsely claims to Laurie that Ben has betrayed the Harpers and she then informs the Longdens about Ben's interference with Jim and Laurie. As revenge, the Longdens nearly drown Ben and later try to find the Harpers to kill them so the truth will not emerge. Ben also enters the swamp to warn Jim and Laurie, who do not initially believe his warnings until Ben becomes a target of the Longdens. After Jim is shot by one of them, Laurie sets a trap that kills one of the brothers and captures the other. In the end, the Harpers' name is cleared and they are finally able to return to civilization, accompanied by Ben.

Cast
Jean Peters as Laurie Harper
Jeffrey Hunter as Ben Tyler
Constance Smith as Noreen McGowan
Walter Brennan as Jim Harper
Tom Tully as Zack Taylor
Harry Shannon as Pat McGowan
Will Wright as Sheriff Brink
Jack Elam as Dave Longden
Harry Carter as Ned Tyler

Production
In September 1951, Debra Paget was set to star in the lead.

References

External links

1952 films
1950s adventure drama films
1952 romantic drama films
20th Century Fox films
American adventure films
American adventure drama films
American romantic drama films
Films scored by Franz Waxman
Films based on American novels
Films directed by Jean Negulesco
Remakes of American films
Films set in the 1910s
1950s English-language films
1950s American films